Joan Winifred Austin (later Lycett, 23 January 1903 – 2 April 1998) was a British female tennis player who was also known as one of "The Babes".

Early life 
23 January 1903, Austin was born in London, England.
Austin's brother was Bunny Austin, a Wimbledon finalist. Austin attended Winchester School for Girls. Austin was taught tennis by her father.

Career 
Austin won the singles title at the Junior Championships of Great Britain in 1920 and 1921.

Partnering with Evelyn Colyer she played doubles in the 1923 Wimbledon tournament and reached the final against Suzanne Lenglen and Elizabeth Ryan but lost in straight sets. Colyer and Austin were known in the British press as "The Babes."

Between 1923 and 1932 she competed in nine editions of the Wimbledon Championships. Her best singles result was reaching the third round in 1923, 1927 and 1929.

In June 1925 Austin and her husband teamed up in the mixed doubles event at Wimbledon and reached the semifinal which they lost in three sets to Suzanne Lenglen and Jean Borotra.

In November 1934 Austin became a professional tennis coach.

Personal life 
12 February 1925, Austin married Randolph Lycett, a tennis player. In August 1926, Austin had a daughter.

Grand Slam finals

Doubles: (1 runners-up)

References

1903 births
1998 deaths
British female tennis players
English female tennis players
Tennis people from Greater London